118 Mall, previously known as MERDEKA @ 118, is a seven-storey glass domed shopping mall currently under construction located in Kuala Lumpur, Malaysia. The name "118" was derived from the number of floors in the Merdeka 118 tower which has a total of 118 storeys. The mall is currently being developed and owned by PNB Merdeka Ventures Sdn Bhd, a wholly-owned subsidiary of Permodalan Nasional Berhad (PNB), which is also the developer for the Merdeka 118. It is a  mall situated at the foot of the tower that will serve its surrounding precinct.

As of today, there are no details yet on the tenants and planned opening date of the mall.

Background 
The master developer had awarded the contract to build a shopping complex as part of the Merdeka 118 development at the former site of Merdeka Park, which was the second oldest public park in Kuala Lumpur, to a joint-venture between WCT Holdings Berhad and TSR Capital Berhad. The mall is planned to be surrounded by 4-acre of greenery and a linear park namely, Merdeka Boulevard At 118, which will also connect the Maharajalela Monorail station and the mall. Construction works on the building as well as the shopping mall began in 2014 and is slated for full completion by late-2023.

Design 

A glass dome will be constructed as the roof of the mall to bring in filtered natural light into the centre of the mall. The mall's organic theme will have sculptural design-story elements and water-features based on Malaysian culture.

Features

Key features of the mall 

 Eat Street – local and international al fresco restaurants offering all-day dining and after-hours hangout spots
 Event Space – a large, bright and inviting area for hosting a wide variety of events and exhibitions
 The Dome – will be the biggest shopping mall dome in Malaysia
 The Raincloud – a dramatic multi-storey water feature with an interactive screen offering customised messages
 Malaysian Artisan District – a curated retail floor dedicated to Malaysian cuisine and heritage products

Transportation 
The mall will be connected to the Kajang Line's  Merdeka MRT station located along Jalan Hang Jebat, which is also connected to an interchange with the Ampang/Sri Petaling Line's  Plaza Rakyat LRT station.

The  Hang Tuah station, serving both the Ampang Line and KL Monorail, is a 600-metre walk southeast.

The mall will also be accessible from the  Maharajalela Monorail station connected through the precinct's linear park under the development.

See also 

 List of shopping malls in Malaysia

References

External links 
 Official Website
 Merdeka 118 Precinct website

Shopping malls in Kuala Lumpur
Buildings and structures under construction in Malaysia